Mirganj is a town and a nagar panchayat in Bareilly district in the Indian state of Uttar Pradesh.

Geography
It has an average elevation of 170 metres (557 feet).

Demographics
As of the 2001 Census of India, Mirganj had a population of 13,336. Males constitute 53% of the population and females 47%. Mirganj has an average literacy rate of 44%, lower than the national average of 59.5%: male literacy is 52%, and female literacy is 35%. In Mirganj, 16% of the population is under 6 years of age.

Transport 
Mirganj is located on the National Highway 530, which connects Rampur with Bareilly. The town is served by the Nagaria Sadat railway station.

References

Cities and towns in Bareilly district